Andreas Wirth (born 19 November 1984 in Heidelberg) is a German racing driver.  In 2004 Wirth won the Formula BMW USA championship after coming state-side, and then advanced to the Champ Car Atlantics in 2005 where he raced for two years, winning three races and finishing 6th and 3rd in the championship.

Following up a full 2006 season in Atlantics, Wirth was named to compete in his first Champ Car race in Dale Coyne Racing's entry at Surfer's Paradise, where he finished in 9th place.  He then went on to race with Coyne in Mexico City.  In 2008 he ran in the Petit Le Mans with PTG Panoz.

For seven seasons Wirth competed in the ADAC GT Masters series where he tallied a total of 9 victories.  In 2016 Wirth moved into Prototype racing in the European Le Mans Series with SMP Racing in their LMP2-class BR01 with co-drivers Stefano Coletti and Julián Leal.

Career 
Wirth began his career in karting in 1998, racing in several junior and senior German Karting series and earning several championships through 2000.  In 2001, he placed second in the German Formula Ford Championship, and finished 11th at the Formula Ford Festival at Brands Hatch.  He then moved to the Formula BMW ADAC series, finishing 9th in the championship in 2002 and 10th in 2003.

American open-wheel racing
In 2004, Wirth moved to the United States, winning the inaugural Formula BMW USA championship with 4 wins and 11 podiums.  He competed in the Atlantic Championship in the 2005 and 2006 seasons, winning 3 times (Denver 2005, Long Beach and Houston 2006) and finishing 3rd in the championship in 2006.  Late in 2006, Wirth ran two Champ Car races for Dale Coyne Racing, finishing 9th at Surfers' Paradise and 15th at Mexico City.  After sitting out 2007, Wirth competed in 3 Atlantic races in 2008 and also drove for Panoz Team PTG at the 2008 Petit Le Mans.

ADAC GT
Wirth returned to Europe in 2009, racing for Alpina in the ADAC GT Masters, winning once with co-driver Jens Klingmann.  In 2010, he finished 6th in the championship for s-Berg Racing, winning two races with Martin Matzke.  Wirth joined Heico Motorsport in 2011, finishing 9th in the championship and winning one race with co-driver Christiaan Frankenhout.

For the next four seasons, Wirth raced in Callaway Competition's GT3 Chevrolet Corvette.  His best season was 2014, where he won four races in a partial season alongside the defending champion Daniel Keilwitz, and placed 6th in the championship.

2016 
In 2016, Wirth finished 3rd in the European Le Mans Series LMP2 championship with Stefano Coletti, driving the SMP Racing BR01 prototype.

Racing record

American Racing results 
(key)

Atlantic Championship

Champ Car

ADAC GT Masters

Complete European Le Mans Series results
Co-Drivers: Stefano Coletti, Julian Leal, Vitaly Petrov

WeatherTech SportsCar Championship
(key)(Races in bold indicate pole position, Results are overall/class)

References

External links 
 Official Website
 DriverDB profile

1984 births
ADAC GT Masters drivers
Atlantic Championship drivers
Champ Car drivers
European Le Mans Series drivers
Formula BMW ADAC drivers
Formula BMW USA drivers
German racing drivers
Living people
Sportspeople from Heidelberg
Racing drivers from Baden-Württemberg
Eifelland Racing drivers
SMP Racing drivers
WeatherTech SportsCar Championship drivers
Forsythe Racing drivers
Dale Coyne Racing drivers
Nürburgring 24 Hours drivers